The uMdoni Local Municipality council consists of thirty-seven members elected by mixed-member proportional representation. Nineteen councillors are elected by first-past-the-post voting in nineteen wards, while the remaining eighteen are chosen from party lists so that the total number of party representatives is proportional to the number of votes received. In the election of 3 August 2016 the African National Congress (ANC) won a majority of twenty-three seats on the council.

Results 
The following table shows the composition of the council after past elections.

December 2000 election

The following table shows the results of the 2000 election.

March 2006 election

The following table shows the results of the 2006 election.

May 2011 election

The following table shows the results of the 2011 election.

August 2016 election

The following table shows the results of the 2016 election.

November 2021 election

The following table shows the results of the 2021 election.

By-elections from November 2021 
The following by-elections were held to fill vacant ward seats in the period since November 2021. 

After the resignation of the previous DA ward 10 councillor, a by-election was held on 30 November 2022. The DA's candidate retained the seat for the party, winning an 88% share. 

After the 27 July by-election, the council was reconfigured as below:

References

uMdoni
Elections in KwaZulu-Natal
Ugu District Municipality